The 2019–20 season was Al-Adalah's first ever season in the Pro League, the top flight of Saudi Arabian football, and their 36th season in existence. The club participated in the Pro League and the King Cup.

The season covered the period from 1 July 2019 to 9 September 2020.

Players

Squad information

Out on loan

Transfers and loans

Transfers in

Loans in

Transfers out

Loans out

Pre-season

Competitions

Overall

Overview

Goalscorers

Last Updated: 29 August 2020

Clean sheets

Last Updated: 12 March 2020

References

Adalah